Seven Hills is a suburb in the Greater Western Sydney region of Sydney, in the state of New South Wales, Australia, located 33 kilometres North West of the Sydney central business district. Seven Hills is within the local government areas of the City of Parramatta and Blacktown City councils.

History
Prior to European settlement in the 1790s, the area now known as Seven Hills was originally settled and occupied for hundreds, if not thousands, of years by indigenous peoples who most probably would have identified with the Warmuli and Toogagal clans, of the Darug nation. The vicinity of Seven Hills was first visited by Europeans very early on in the settlement of the colony of New South Wales, possibly as early as April 1788 by Arthur Phillip or more certainly by Watkin Tench in June 1789.

At least 13 further grants were made in this area before 1800. Matthew Pearce (1762–1831) was granted ) in 1795, which he named after Kings Langley in Hertfordshire, England, where he was said to have been born. George Best and John Pye Snr were given land grants in Seven Hills in 1796.

The area of the Pearce grant bounded by the present Old Windsor Road, Seven Hills Road, Chapel Lane (in what is now Baulkham Hills) and Toongabbie Creek became known as Seven Hills from about 1800, because his farm was situated near the seventh hill along the road from Parramatta. In 1804 part of the Cumberland Plain in an area which later became the Grantham Estate was reserved for use as Prospect Common and at some time after this possibly around 1819 two  land grants were made to Samuel Haynes and Samuel Dent.

Seven Hills encompassed a much larger area than now and as late as 1900, landowners as far afield as the modern suburbs of Bella Vista, Glenwood, and Parklea identified their properties as being located in Seven Hills. In the period 1959 to the 1970s, housing schemes excised land that was previously part of Seven Hills to create the suburbs of Lalor Park and Kings Langley.

The railway from Parramatta to Blacktown Road station (now Blacktown) was completed as a single line in 1860. A stationmaster's residence and siding were constructed near a level crossing at what was to become Toongabbie Road (later Seven Hills Road) in December 1863. A platform was built in 1869, and stops at the station were scheduled in the timetable from September of that year. The road bridge on Seven Hills Road across the railway line was constructed in 1975, replacing the level crossing.

Grantham Heritage Park
The Haynes and Dent lots were acquired in 1897 by William Chadwick. Chadwick commissioned a Sydney architect, Byera Hadley (later to become the leading architectural academic in NSW), to build a large house on the land which he named "Melrose". A much smaller house known as "Drumtochty" had been built around 1890 on the estate, to the south, at the corner of Seven Hills Road and what is now Australorp Avenue.

In 1901 the property was acquired by John Rabone who commenced a poultry breeding and experimental farm which he named "Grantham Poultry Stud". In 1906 there was a further change in ownership and the farm was under the control of Martin & Co owned by a Mr Francis Martin. In 1912 the company appointed James Hadlington who concurrently held the position as the state Department of Agriculture's "Poultry Expert".

By 1917 Australia was confronting the problem of providing suitable employment for both able-bodied and disabled veterans of the First World War. This led to the development of soldier settlement schemes. Hadlington persuaded the state government to acquire the farm for such a scheme it being thought that ex-servicemen including those disabled and even limbless would be able to make an adequate living for themselves and their families from poultry farming. The transfer took place in July 1917 and the area of the farm nearer Seven Hills Station fronting (what is now) Grantham Road was subdivided into eleven  blocks for married men with the balance becoming a poultry breeding, stock and feed storage and training facility named "Grantham State Poultry Farm".

Initially the ex-servicemen trainees on the farm were housed in tents but by 1918 barracks-like accommodation had been put up near Seven Hills Road. The small farms were initially taken up by "maimed settlers" who occupied small houses which had been built for them and their families. As with other such schemes some of the settlers found it hard to make a living from agriculture despite establishment loans and sustenance payments and by 1922 some of the original occupiers had abandoned the project leaving the blocks for other ex-servicemen to take over. Over the next three decades the farms were turned over to other activities or further subdivided and by the 1950s none were being used for poultry farming although many such enterprises had been successfully established in the surrounding districts principally by migrants from Europe.

In 1923 the "Grantham State Poultry Farm" was no longer required for the settlement scheme and passed to the Department of Agriculture for use as a demonstration farm and named the "Government Poultry Farm". In 1939 the farm's function changed to one of experimentation and research aimed at improving the quality of the poultry farming in the state. This led to yet another change in name with the farm becoming known as "Poultry Experiment Farm, Seven Hills". From the 1940s the farm was the site of ground breaking research (notably by Professor Bill McClymont and Dr Len Hart) into poultry husbandry and nutrition leading to significant improvements in the efficiency of poultry farming in Australia and overseas. This was officially recognised when the name was changed to the Poultry Research Station in 1960.

 In 1971 a new building was erected to house research and administrative functions of the research station and (later) offices of the NSW Egg Marketing Board.

By 1983 the site was known as "Agricultural Station, Seven Hills" and operations had begun to wind down. Much of the Department of Agriculture land was declared surplus to requirements and by 1989 the station had closed and the land sold off for residential development.

 In 2004 the remnant of the estate including "Melrose", "Drumtochty" (by now moved to the northern end of the estate) and the administrative building were acquired the City of Blacktown. In 2008 a plan for the use of the administration building as council offices and the development of the lands as a heritage park was announced and public comment was invited. The remnant portion has been named "Grantham Heritage Park". The entire estate, including Melrose and Drumtochty, is heritage-listed.

 The park lands contain some of the last vestiges of Cumberland Plain woodlands and the Grantham Heritage Park Memorial commemorating the soldier settlers and trainees.

Heritage listings 
Seven Hills has a number of heritage-listed sites, including:
 37-39 Roger Place: Dayton House
 71 Seven Hills Road: Grantham Poultry Research Station
 313 Seven Hills Road: St Andrew's Anglican Church

Demographics
The most common ancestries were Australian 21.8%, English 19.3%, Indian 6.9%, Irish 6.1% and Scottish 4.4%.
59.4% of people were born in Australia. The most common countries of birth were India 6.9%, Sri Lanka 2.7%, England 2.4%, Philippines 2.3% and China (excludes SARs and Taiwan) 2.0%.
The most common responses for religion were Catholic 30.8%, Anglican 16.4%, No Religion 12.1%, Hinduism 8.2% and Islam 3.8%.
61.1% of people only spoke English at home. Other languages spoken at home included Tamil 3.5%, Hindi 3.1%, Arabic 2.8%, Punjabi 2.5% and Cantonese 1.9%.

Commercial areas
Seven Hills Plaza is a major shopping center in Seven Hills. It is located adjacent to Prospect Highway and slightly to the south-west of the railway station. It was originally opened in 1960 as Seven Hills Regional Shopping Centre.

There are a very large number of industrial and commercial developments contained in the area to the north of the railway bounded by the Prospect Highway, Abbott Road to the north, Old Windsor Road to the west and Blacktown Creek to the south. The studios of broadcasting station Hope 103.2 FM and the NSW Fire Brigade Station, built in 1995 are situated on the southern side of Leabons Lane near the junction with Seven Hills Road South.

Residential areas
The suburb is predominantly residential. Florida Place, a cul-de-sac, is typical of many residential streets in Seven Hills especially those south of the railway. The buildings show a transition from the mid 20th century single storey mixed construction dwellings with an average of approx 100 m2 floorspace on 600 to 900 m2 blocks to replacement two storey brick veneer dwellings built in the 2000s with twice to three times the floorspace.

Leabons Lane, is typical of streets that are used as transport corridors with a mix of residential and light commercial use. Despite being narrow it is a busy thoroughfare linking the residential areas of south Seven Hills with Blacktown. Note the plethora of signage, traffic calming devices and utility poles strung with overhead power and TV cabling typical of streetscapes in western Sydney.

Transport
Sydney Trains provides regular services from Seven Hills to Central in 34 minutes. The suburb incorporates the localities of Grantham (the Grantham Estate) and Grantham Heights. The actual seven hills are situated along the Old Windsor Road between Westmead and where today's road intersects Norwest Boulevard, Bella Vista.
Seven Hills railway station is a major interchange on the North Shore & Western Line of the Sydney Trains network with in excess of 2000 commuter parking spaces. Seven Hills is located approximately 32 km by rail or 34 minutes travel from Central railway station, on the railway line to Penrith.

The M2 Hills Motorway, M4 Western Motorway and Westlink M7 are three major arterial roads that link Seven Hills to other parts of Sydney. The Prospect Highway and Seven Hills Road are other major roads in the suburb.

Private bus operator Hillsbus provides regular services to Sydney CBD, Macquarie Park, Baulkham Hills, Bella Vista, Castle Hill, Blacktown, Toongabbie, Pendle Hill and Parramatta and Busways services to Kings Langley. Hillsbus has two depots in Seven Hills, one on Hartley Road which is Hillsbus Seven Hills and one on Foundry Road which is also the company headquarters.

Climate

Education
Pre-schools

There are at least six early childhood educational facilities located in Seven Hills including two owned and operated by Blacktown City Council

Primary schools
 Bert Oldfield Public School – K-6 government school
 Our Lady of Lourdes Primary School – K-6 Roman Catholic systemic school
 Seven Hills Public School – K-6 government school
 Seven Hills North Public School K-6 government school
 Seven Hills West Public School – P-6 government school
 The Meadows Public School – K-6 government school

Secondary schools
 The Hills Sports High School – 7-12 government high school (formerly known as Grantham High School to 2001) – offers Talented Sports Program and is also location of a Saturday Community Languages School
 Seven Hills High School – 7-10 government high school – feeder for the 11-12 Wyndham College

School for special purposes (SSP)
 William Rose School  – K-12 school catering for students who have a visual disability plus an additional disability, students who have a hearing disability plus an additional disability and students who are Deafblind.

Notable residents
 Maureen Caird, athlete
 Steve Cummins, rugby union player with the Melbourne Rebels
 Glenn Druery, Ultra Distance cycle racer, grew up in Seven Hills 
 Blake Gaudry, 2012 Olympian
 Hamilton Hume, early explorer, born in Seven Hills
 Felix Lee, Stray Kids member
 Matt Moran, celebrity chef whose family lived in MacKenzie Boulevard. He attended Metella Road Public School and Grantham High School
 Nathan Rees, 41st Premier of New South Wales

References

The 2001 City of Blacktown Social Plan
 Time Line for Seven Hills and Lalor Park

External links
Views of Seven Hills Soldiers Settlement prior to 1920(?) – State Library of NSW set which includes a view of "the homestead" (i.e. Melrose) at the time.
 Views of the agricultural station in 1923 – State Library of NSW
 Shop front in 1965 – the "Vinnies Op Shop" was located near the corner of Best Road and George Street until 2013 when the site was sold for re-development.
 Timeline for Seven Hills
  [CC-By-SA]

 
Suburbs of Sydney
Australian soldier settlements
1800 establishments in Australia
Populated places established in 1800
City of Blacktown
City of Parramatta